Csokvaomány is a village in Borsod-Abaúj-Zemplén County in northeastern Hungary. , the village had a population of 880. The closest town is Ózd (20 km).

History 
The first mention of "Csokva" and "Omány" villages from the era of Árpád dynasty.  During the Turkish invasion, the villages were burned. In 1943 the two villages joined as Csokvaomány.

References

 Hungarian Catolics Lexikon: Csokvaomány

Populated places in Borsod-Abaúj-Zemplén County